Greg Hjorth (14 June 1963 – 13 January 2011) was an Australian Professor of Mathematics, chess International Master (1984) and joint (with Ian Rogers) Commonwealth Champion in 1983. He worked in the field of mathematical logic.

Chess career
Hjorth came second in the 1980 Australian Chess Championship, at the age of 16. He won the Doeberl Cup in Canberra in 1982, 1985 and 1987, and played for Australia in the Chess Olympiads of 1982, 1984 and 1986.

According to Chessmetrics, his best single performance was at the 1984 British Chess Championship, where he scored 4/7 against 2551-rated opposition, for a performance rating of 2570.

Hjorth retired from most chess in the 1980s.

Mathematical career
Hjorth earned his PhD in 1993, under the direction of W. Hugh Woodin, with a dissertation entitled On the influence of second uniform indiscernible.   He held faculty positions at the University of California, Los Angeles and the University of Melbourne.  Among his most important contributions to set theory was the so-called theory of turbulence, used in the theory of Borel equivalence relations. In 1998, he was an Invited Speaker of the International Congress of Mathematicians in Berlin.

Death
Hjorth died of a heart attack in Melbourne, on 13 January 2011.

Book
G. Hjorth: Classification and Orbit Equivalence Relations, Mathematical Surveys and Monographs, 75, American Mathematical Society, Providence, Rhode Island, 2000.

References

External links
Greg Hjorth's webpage at UCLA

Chessmetrics Player Profile: Greg Hjorth
IM Greg Hjorth interviewed by FM Grant Szuveges

1963 births
2011 deaths
Set theorists
Mathematicians from Melbourne
Australian chess players
Chess International Masters
Chess Olympiad competitors
University of California, Los Angeles faculty
Mathematical logicians
Tarski lecturers